In mathematics, the notions of prevalence and shyness are notions of "almost everywhere" and "measure zero" that are well-suited to the study of infinite-dimensional spaces and make use of the translation-invariant Lebesgue measure on finite-dimensional real spaces. The term "shy" was suggested by the American mathematician John Milnor.

Definitions

Prevalence and shyness 

Local prevalence and shyness 

Theorems involving prevalence and shyness 

 Every shy Borel set  admits a transverse measure that is finite and has compact support. Furthermore, this measure can be chosen so that its support has arbitrarily small diameter.
 Any finite or countable union of shy sets is also shy.
 Any shy set is also locally shy.
 A subset  of -dimensional Euclidean space  is shy if and only if it has Lebesgue measure zero.

In the following, "almost every" is taken to mean that the stated property holds of a prevalent subset of the space in question.

 Almost every function  in the  space  has the property that  Clearly, the same property holds for the spaces of -times differentiable functions 
 For  almost every sequence  has the property that the series  diverges.
 Prevalence version of the Whitney embedding theorem: Let  be a compact manifold of class  and dimension  contained in   For  almost every  function  is an embedding of 
 For  almost every  function  has the property that all of its periodic points are hyperbolic. In particular, the same is true for all the period  points, for any integer

References 

 
 

Measure theory
Functional analysis